Manuel Coronado Pla (born 7 April 1993), commonly known as Lolo, is a Spanish professional footballer who plays as an attacking midfielder for Mérida AD.

Having spent his early career at Valladolid in La Liga, Lugo in Segunda División and Benfica B in the Portuguese Segunda Liga, he played most of it in the lower leagues of his country. He made over 140 appearances and scored over 40 goals in the Spanish third tier, in service of eight clubs.

Club career

Valladolid
Born in Mérida, Extremadura, Lolo began his career with Real Valladolid's youth sides, and made his senior debut in 2010–11 for the B team in the Tercera División. On 20 August 2012, he appeared in his first official game with the main squad, playing the last four minutes in a 1–0 La Liga away win over Real Zaragoza, the first matchday of the season.

Benfica
Lolo signed for S.L. Benfica in Portugal on 2 August 2013 in spite of being threatened by his former club, which later led to compensation as his link was not severed by mutual consent. He was assigned to the reserves and played his first match for them on the 26th, coming from the bench in the 81st minute of the Segunda Liga home fixture against Portimonense S.C. and scoring the final goal in a 3–0 victory.

On 30 August 2014, Lolo was loaned to Segunda División's CD Lugo on a season-long deal. The following summer, he joined Segunda División B side Cádiz CF also on loan.

Elche
In the 2016 off-season, Lolo was acquired by Mexican club Club Necaxa, but was immediately loaned back to CD Toledo of the Spanish third tier. He helped them to finish second in their group, and then signed for Elche CF of the same league in July 2017.

Lolo contributed two goals in Elche's promotion campaign (five in all competitions), but spent the following season on loan at Recreativo de Huelva and Valencia CF Mestalla.

Later career
On 14 July 2019, Lolo signed a two-year contract with Gimnàstic de Tarragona, but was unregistered from the main squad the following transfer window due to poor performances, and terminated his contract in March 2020.

In September 2020, Lolo signed for CD Guijuelo. His only season was marred by injury and resulted in a double relegation to the new Tercera Federación following a league restructuring; he signed for his hometown club Mérida AD in the league above in June 2021. Including the Copa Federación, he scored 12 times in 34 total games as his first campaign at the Estadio Romano ended in promotion via the playoffs; his deal was then extended for a second year.

References

External links

1993 births
Living people
People from Mérida, Spain
Sportspeople from the Province of Badajoz
Spanish footballers
Footballers from Extremadura
Association football midfielders
La Liga players
Segunda División players
Segunda División B players
Tercera División players
Primera Federación players
Segunda Federación players
Real Valladolid Promesas players
Real Valladolid players
CD Lugo players
Cádiz CF players
CD Toledo players
Elche CF players
Recreativo de Huelva players
Valencia CF Mestalla footballers
Gimnàstic de Tarragona footballers
CD Guijuelo footballers
Mérida AD players
Liga Portugal 2 players
S.L. Benfica B players
Club Necaxa footballers
Spanish expatriate footballers
Expatriate footballers in Portugal
Spanish expatriate sportspeople in Portugal